Quilp Rock is a small, isolated rock in Laubeuf Fjord, lying  south-southeast of the south tip of Pinero Island and  off the northwest side of Pourquoi Pas Island, off the west coast of Graham Land. First surveyed in 1948 by the Falkland Islands Dependencies Survey (FIDS), it was named by them after the dwarf, Daniel Quilp, a vicious, ill-tempered character in The Old Curiosity Shop, by Charles Dickens.

See also
List of Antarctic and subantarctic islands

References

Rock formations of Graham Land
Fallières Coast